The world's smallest fish depends on the measurement used.

A level of uncertainty about the full size range exists for some of these, as only a few specimens have been measured.

Little or no data is available on weight of most of these, but at less than  it is likely that the stout infantfish (Schindleria brevipinguis) is the smallest if using this feature.

List of smallest fish in the world

See also
List of largest fish
Smallest organisms

References

Lists of fishes
Lists of superlatives